Cobb House or Cobbs House may refer to:

 Whitman-Cobb House, New Market, Alabama
 Cobb House (Grove Hill, Alabama)
 Alston-Cobb House, Grove Hill, Alabama
 Pattie Cobb Hall, Searcy, Arkansas
 Ollinger-Cobb House, Milton, Florida
 Cobb-Treanor House, Athens, Georgia, listed on the National Register of Historic Places (NRHP)
 T. R. R. Cobb House, Athens, Georgia
 Steele-Cobb House, Decatur, Georgia, listed on the NRHP
 Whitney Cobb House, Richmond, Kentucky, listed on the NRHP in Kentucky
 Auld-McCobb House, Boothbay Harbor, Maine
 George Cobb House, Worcester, Massachusetts
 Frank J. Cobbs House, Cadillac, Michigan
 Hezekiah W. and Sarah E. Fishell Cobb House, Perry, Michigan, listed on the NRHP
 Cyrus B. Cobb House, White Bear Lake, Minnesota
 Cobb House (Vicksburg, Mississippi), a Mississippi Landmark
 Caldwell-Cobb-Love House, Lincolnton, North Carolina
 John Franklin Cobb House, Bell View, North Carolina
 Frank J. and Maude Louise Cobbs Estate, Portland, Oregon listed on the NRHP
 Samuel Cobb House, Portland, Oregon
 Whitney Cobb House, Richmond, Kentucky, listed on the NRHP
 George N. Cobb House, Oconomowoc, Wisconsin, listed on the NRHP

See also
Cobb Building (disambiguation)